The men's snowboard big air competition of the FIS Freestyle Ski and Snowboarding World Championships 2017 was held at Sierra Nevada, Spain on March 16 (qualifying) and March 17 (finals). 
67 athletes from 28 countries competed.

Qualification
The following are the results of the qualification.

Heat 1

Heat 2

Semi-final
The following are the results of the semi-final.

Final
The following are the results of the finals.

References

Snowboard big air, men's